Inboekstelsel was a system of indentured child labour instituted by Europeans in Southern Africa during the 18th and 19th centuries. The word is derived from the Dutch verb inboeken (register; literally "in-book"), referring to the requirement of entering the names and details of the inboekeling (also spelled inboekseling), or apprentices, in the Landdros's register. It is widely seen as a form of slavery by historians of South Africa.  

The system had its origin in the Cape Northern Frontier during the second half of the 18th century, when settlers would capture native children, and force them to work as indentured labourers until adulthood. When Boer trekkers migrated into the Transvaal during the 1840s, they brought the inboekstelsel system with them. Inboekelinge children were captured during raids, or handed over as apprentices by their conquered parents in return for land or goods. In some cases they were sold by Boer settlers to other burghers, in what became known as the trade in "black ivory".

In the Transvaal, the inboekelings numbered about 4,000 in 1866, nearly one for every ten settlers. In 1869 the synod of the Dutch Reformed Church adopted a resolution condemning the practice, but rescinded it two years later on the grounds that the system no longer existed. In the Transvaal, legislation required that males be released from indenture at the age of 25, while females were released at 21, but the law was not always observed in remote frontier districts.

British attitudes towards the Inboekstelsel system were ambivalent. The British administration of Transvaal between 1877 and 1881 did not affect it.

Historians like Elizabeth Eldredge and Fred Morton have argued that Inboekstelsel was a system of slavery. Although legal slavery was formerly abolished in the Cape colony in 1834, the inboekstelling system allowed white settlers to continue to practice forced labour.

See also
 Griqua people
 Restavec, a similar system in modern Haiti
 Slavery in South Africa

References

External links
 Slavery in the South African Interior During the 19th Century

Unfree labour
Apprenticeship
History of South Africa
Afrikaans words and phrases